Abul Amlak Moulay Sharif ibn 'Ali – also known as  Moulay Ali al-Sharif or Moulay Mohammed Cherif, Moulay Cherif, Moulay al-Sharif or Muhammad I – was born in 1589 and died June 4, 1659, at Sijilmasa. He was an Arab Emir of Tafilalt from 1631 to 1636. He was a Sharif whose family claimed descent from the Islamic prophet Muhammad through his grandson Hasan. He is considered as the founder of the Alaouite Dynasty of Morocco as he was the father of Sidi Muhammad, Al-Rashid of Morocco and Ismail Ibn Sharif.

Family origins 
The Alaouites were a family of sharifian religious notables (shurafa in Arabic) who claimed descent from Muhammad via his descendant Hasan, the son of Ali and of Muhammad's daughter Fatimah. According to the dynasty's official history, the family migrated from the Hejaz (in Arabia) to the Tafilalt during the 12th or 13th century at the request of the locals who hoped that the presence of a sharifian family would benefit the region. It is possible that the Alaouites were merely one of many Arab families who moved westwards to Morocco during this period. The Tafilalt was an oasis region in the Ziz Valley in eastern Morocco whose capital is Sijilmasa, historically an important terminus of the trans-Saharan trade routes.

Moulay Sharif's first ancestor to have established himself in Morocco after migrating from Hejaz is Moulay Hassan al-Dakhil in the 13th century. He was Imam of Sijilmassa and like him, his posterity resided in Sijilmasa. Moulay Sharif's family were the spiritual leaders of Sijilmasa. His 4th degree ancestor, Moulay Youssef, succeeded his father Moulay Ali Cherif I at the head of the zaouia. Historian Mohammed al-Ifrani quotes that the act which confirms this authority was still, in the 17th century, in the hands of one of his great-grandchildren. Moulay Sharif is the 4th generation descendant of Moulay Youssef and his wife Seyida (Lady in Arabic) Khalifa Tālākakīn al-Ṣanhājī of the Almoravid dynasty.

Biography

Character 
Since his teenage years, Moulay Sharif was reported to be a virtuous man and the most prominent of his father Moulay Ali Cherif III's sons. As an adult, he was a trustworthy man as people from Sijilmasa and the Maghreb (Morocco) would solicit him for mediation.

Reign 
Moulay Sharif was born in (November 9?) 1589 as the eldest son of Moulay Ali Cherif. Before his ascension, he was Mukadam (General in Arabic) in Sijilmasa and commanded a body of troops. In 1631, Moulay Sharif was proclaimed Emir of Tafilalt by the Sijilmassa inhabitants. Tafilalt is a region composed of ksours which all held equal status and traded together. Historians agree that Moulay Sharif did not conquer all ksours in Tafilalt but instead was unanimously proclaimed Emir of Tafilalt as people held the man in high esteem and regarded his prestigious sharifian lineage as upmost legitimacy for leadership.

Moulay Sharif's rise to sovereignty took place when the power of the Saadi Sultanate was in serious decline and multiple regional factions rebelled and fought for control of what is present-day Morocco. Among the most powerful of these factions were the Dilaites, a federation of Sanhaja Amazigh in the Middle Atlas who increasingly dominated central Morocco at this time, reaching the peak of their power in the 1640s when their leader Mohammed al-Hajj al-Dila'i conquered Fez and Salé. Another faction was led by Aboulhasen Ali ben Mohammed Essoussi Essemlali (commonly named Bou Hasen or Abu Hassun), who initially serving the Saadians had rebelled with his men and became leader of the Sous valley and Dra'a since 1614. Bou Hasen was a very good friend of Moulay Sharif, the two men had very intimate links of friendship.

Conflict with Tabouasamt 
In 1633, the people of Tabouasamt town rejected Moulay Sharif's authority. The town is surrounded by a citadel situated 20 km to the South of Sijilmasa. A great enmity existed between Moulay Sharif and the Beni Ezzoubir inhabitants of Tabouasamt. The latter were prideful of their mighty citadel and their wealth from commerce which resulted in their rejection of any central authority from Sijilmasa. Moulay Sharif called his good friend Bou Hasen for help in the Tafilalt, while people from Tabouasamt called the Dilaites. Both responded to their respective calls and the two armies of Bou Hasen and the Dilaites met in Sijilmasa. However, July 8, 1633, the armies separated without fighting, as peace was made to avoid spilling the blood of Muslims.

When the people of Tabouasamt saw the great friendship and intimate ties that linked Emir Moulay Sharif and Bou Hasen they put meticulous effort at aiming to break these links. They expressed devotion to Bou Hasen and would have their children serve him exclusively. Their efforts paid off as reasons for discord between the two men increased and their relationship ended badly. Bou Hasen, who after people from Tabouasamt took their party and established one of his men, Bou Bekr, as Governor of Sijilmasa to align with the peace treaty of non aggression between Moulay Sharif and Tabouasamt. He went back to Sous afterwards.
 
Moulay Sharif's eldest son Sidi Mohammed not fooled by the people from Tabouasamt's successful plans against his father's authority, took the opportunity to take revenge of their deeds. With 200 horsemen, by night he assaulted the citadel. His men made a hole on one of the walls of the citadel and some men managed to enter it, while others climbed the wall. Once inside, they massacred some of the people sleeping in the citadel and slaughtered the defenseless inhabitants. Sidi Mohammed and his men looted the citadel and with this assault, captured Tabouasamt. Moulay Sharif was informed of the capture of the citadel by his son, he was very pleased and this act healed his heart of further revenge he was planning on them. The following day of the capture of Tabouasamt, Moulay Sharif entered the citadel victorious and a procession took place. Defeated, Tabouasamt inhabitants recognized Moulay Sharif as their sovereign.

Bou Hasen got angry when he heard of the news and then ordered his partisans from Sijilmassa to capture Moulay Sharif. The earliest accounts of this episode which are from historian Mohammed al-Ifrani claim that Bou Hasen wanted to capture only Moulay Sharif and tasked the Governor of Sijilmasa and his partisans to do so. Al Naciri too supports this version. While Al Zayani claims that Bou Hasen tasked in secret Tabouasamt's inhabitants to capture either Moulay Sharif or his eldest son Sidi Mohammed and that he was coming to Tabouasamt to take the captured home in Sous. Bou Hasen succeeded in his plan and in both versions Moulay Sharif was captured by treason and sent to Sous as a prisoner. The precise dating of his capture in not stated by historic sources; however, it happened shortly after the capture of Tabouasamt by Sidi Mohammed, therefore, between 1634 and 1635.

Other historic sources claim that Moulay Sharif led an attack against Abu Hassun's garrison at Tabuasamt in 1635 or 1636 (1045 AH) but failed to expel them. Abu Hassun forced him to go into exile to the Sous valley.

Captivity 
Bou Hasen kept Moulay Sharif a prisoner in Sous, inside a citadel. His release was granted upon paying a considerable ransom. Moulay Sharif was a captive of Bou Hasen but he also treated him well. Among other things, Bou Hasen gifted him a mulatto slave from the M'gharfa tribe who later gave birth to one of his son, Moulay Ismail.

In 1637 (1047 AH), Sidi Mohammed upon amassing the huge ransom bought his father's freedom and Moulay Sharif went back home in Sijilmasa. While his father was a captive, his eldest son Sidi Mohammed (or Muhammad II) took up the struggle and became the de facto Emir. Upon Moulay Sharif's release in 1637 and when he was safely far from Sous, Sidi Mohammed successfully led a rebellion which expelled Bou Hasen's followers from Sijilmasa. With this success, on April 23, 1640, he was proclaimed Emir of Tafilalt in place of his father, who relinquished the throne to him.

Later years and death 

Having relinquished the throne to his eldest son Sidi Mohammed, Moulay Sharif abandoned politics and concentrated his life in piety and in the seeking of God's favors. Moulay Sharif was very close to his youngest sons to whom he was affectionate. During one notable episode of his later life, Arabs from Tafilalt offered him gifts when they came to greet him. Among those gifts were a Spanish slave to serve him. The man Dom Louis, was a Spanish captive stolen from his master Ben Bakar in Tafilalt. Moulay Sharif instead of being grateful of their present thought it bad of the robbery of a slave from his master. Moulay Sharif was going to order him brought back to his master but changed his mind when his young boys wanted to keep him as they had no Christian slaves and the man looked healthy. He kept Dom Louis in his services to please his sons, but as each of his young sons wanted Dom Louis, he organized a draw which was won by Moulay Ismail and Moulay Hachem. Quickly Dom Louis became very close to his young masters with whom he had very close bonds with.

Moulay Sharif died at Sijilmasa (near present-day Rissani), Tafilalt, on 4 June 1659. Upon his death, his eldest son Sidi Mohammed was once again proclaimed sovereign. But Sidi Mohammed's strong rivalry with his half-brother Moulay al-Rashid resulted in the latter's evasion from Tafilalt in fear of Sidi Mohammed's retaliation. In 1664 however, Moulay Rachid who auto-proclaimed himself Sultan battled his eldest brother Sultan Sidi Mohammed at the Angad Plains and was victorious while his brother perished. Moulay Rachid then became the first Alaouite Sultan of Morocco and went on to assert control over most of present-day Morocco.

Moulay Sharif's mausoleum is in the center of a mosque and religious complex in Rissani today. The complex was rebuilt in 1955 following flood damage.

Personal life 
Moulay Sharif issued 208 children, he had 84 boys and 124 girls. He had a harem of slave concubines, one of them a concubine of the M'ghafra tribe. Moulay Sharif's more prominent sons are: his eldest son Sultan Sidi Muhammad, Moulay Elkebir, Moulay Elharran, Moulay Mehrez, Sultan Moulay al-Rashid, Moulay Boufares, Sultan Moulay Ismail and Moulay Ahmed, the youngest among his famous sons.

References

1589 births
1659 deaths
Arab princes
17th-century Arabs
People from Rissani
Sultans of Morocco
A
Moroccan people of Arab descent
People from Tafilalt
16th-century Arabs
16th-century Moroccan people
17th-century Moroccan people
17th-century monarchs in Africa
Hasanids